Artem Knyazev (born 16 May 1980) is an Uzbekistani former pair skater. He competed for much of his career with Marina Aganina. They became the 2004–05 Uzbekistani national champions and competed at the 2006 Winter Olympics.

Career 
Knyazev competed with Irina Galkina at the 1997 and 1998 World Junior Championships. They parted ways at the end of the 1997–98 season.

In 1998, Knyazev began a two-season partnership with Irina Shabanova. The pair placed eighth at the 1999 Four Continents Championships and ninth in 2000 Four Continents. They trained in Pervouralsk, Russia.

Knyazev teamed up with Marina Aganina in 2000. The pair was coached by Petr Kiprushev in Pervouralsk. In the 2005–06 season, Knyazev began helping coach himself and Aganina. They represented Uzbekistan at the 2006 Winter Olympics in Turin, where they placed 16th. Knyazev retired from competition following the 2006–07 season. He co-coached Aganina and her new partner.

Knyazev has performed in and directed Russian ice shows.

Programs

With Aganina

With Shabanova

Results
GP: Grand Prix; JGP: Junior Series / Junior Grand Prix

With Aganina

With Shabanova

With Galkina

References

External links

 

Uzbekistani male pair skaters
Figure skaters at the 2006 Winter Olympics
Olympic figure skaters of Uzbekistan
1980 births
Living people
Sportspeople from Tashkent
Asian Games medalists in figure skating
Figure skaters at the 2003 Asian Winter Games
Figure skaters at the 2007 Asian Winter Games
Uzbekistani expatriates in Russia
Asian Games bronze medalists for Uzbekistan
Medalists at the 2003 Asian Winter Games
Medalists at the 2007 Asian Winter Games